Vaso Vasić (born 26 April 1990) is a professional footballer who plays as a goalkeeper for Luzern. Born in Switzerland, he represented Serbia internationally.

Club career
In the summer of 2021, he returned to Switzerland and signed a one-year contract with Luzern.

International career
Vasić was born in Switzerland to parents of Serbian descent. He represented the Serbia U-21 team.

References

External links

1990 births
People from Leuggern
Swiss people of Serbian descent
Living people
Swiss men's footballers
Serbian footballers
Serbia under-21 international footballers
Association football goalkeepers
FC Winterthur players
SC Young Fellows Juventus players
FC Schaffhausen players
Grasshopper Club Zürich players
Apollon Smyrnis F.C. players
Royal Excel Mouscron players
FC Luzern players
Swiss Challenge League players
Swiss Super League players
Super League Greece players
Belgian Pro League players
Serbian expatriate footballers
Expatriate footballers in Greece
Serbian expatriate sportspeople in Greece
Expatriate footballers in Belgium
Serbian expatriate sportspeople in Belgium